Yang Xuezhe (born 1 November 1997) is a Chinese sailor. He competed in the Nacra 17 event at the 2020 Summer Olympics.

References

External links
 

1997 births
Living people
Chinese male sailors (sport)
Olympic sailors of China
Sailors at the 2020 Summer Olympics – Nacra 17
Place of birth missing (living people)
21st-century Chinese people